Tagoi may be,

Tagoi language, Sudan
Rana tagoi, the Tago frog